Franklin Davey McDowell (1888–1965) was a Canadian writer, whose novel The Champlain Road won the Governor General's Award for English-language fiction in 1939.

Beginning his career in 1909 as a journalist with The Toronto World, the Toronto Mail and Empire and the Winnipeg Free Press, McDowell also published a number of short stories. He subsequently worked for Canadian National Railways from 1923 to 1953.

Bibliography
The Champlain Road (1939)
Forges of Freedom (1943)

References

External links
 

1888 births
1965 deaths
Journalists from Ontario
Canadian male short story writers
Canadian male novelists
People from Clarington
Writers from Ontario
Governor General's Award-winning fiction writers
20th-century Canadian novelists
20th-century Canadian short story writers
20th-century Canadian male writers
Canadian male non-fiction writers